Negrowool Swamp was a swamp in Pemiscot County in the U.S. state of Missouri. The precise location of the swamp is unknown to the GNIS.

The swamp was formerly called "Niggerwool Swamp". The swamp was so named because the thick grass was likened to African-American hair.

References

Landforms of Pemiscot County, Missouri
Swamps of the United States